Brian Adamkiewicz is a surfer, skateboarder, and filmmaker who won the Cannes Film Festival Emerging Filmmakers Showcase award for best student documentary for "Build Ramps Not Walls".  Adamkiewicz is a graduate of Long Beach High School and lives in Long Beach, NY.

References 

Living people
American film directors
Year of birth missing (living people)